The 1954 Star World Championship was held in Cascais, Portugal in 1954.

Results

References

Star World Championships
1954 in sailing
Sport in Cascais
Sailing competitions in Portugal
1954 in Portuguese sport